Daniel Enzo Alberto (born 10 April 1956) is an Argentine former football defender.

References

External links
 Daniel Alberto at BDFA.com.ar 
 Daniel Alberto at TangoFoot.free.fr 

1956 births
Living people
Sportspeople from Buenos Aires Province
Argentine expatriate footballers
Argentine footballers
Association football defenders
Club Atlético Independiente footballers
Paris FC players
RC Lens players
FC Rouen players
Stade Lavallois players
Nîmes Olympique players
Tours FC players
Expatriate footballers in France
Ligue 1 players
Ligue 2 players
Argentine Primera División players
Argentine expatriate sportspeople in France